Pinkfong Wonderstar is a South Korean preschool CGI animated television series by Pinkfong and The Pinkfong Company. It is based around its mascot of the same name. Pinkfong Wonderstar premiered in South Korea on Korean Broadcasting System on June 27, 2019, and later premiered globally on YouTube under its YouTube Originals label on December 3, 2020. In this series, a pink, extraterrestrial fox from the fictional planet Staria named Pinkfong, and a green and beige hedgehog with glasses named Hogi, meet, befriend each other, and become a duo called Wonderstar (currently Pinkfong and Hogi). In each episode, they help their friends with their problems, and gain a friendship badge (currently, they get Cube-Cubes) upon their success. Pinkfong and Hogi each have different abilities. Pinkfong has a star shaped necklace with magical powers, while Hogi is very intelligent and has encyclopedic knowledge.

Plot

Pinkfong and Hogi are two best friends who can help anyone in Wonderville with the help of Pinkfong's magical powers and Hogi's intelligent thinking.

Pinkfong Wonderstar Characters
Pinkfong (voiced by Kyoung-i Jo in Korean, Colleen Villard in English) – A pink male fox from Staria and the main protagonist who helps solve his friends' problems with his magic star powers.
Hogi (voiced by Soeun Lee in Korean, Cassandra Lee Morris in English) – A green and beige bespectacled male hedgehog who enjoys stargazing and reading books, and is Pinkfong's best friend.
Jeni (voiced by Saehae Kim in Korean, Tara Sands in English) – An athletic yellow female rabbit who loves collecting shiny things.
Poki (voiced by Harim Song in Korean, Stephanie Sheh in English) – A red male monkey who invents things and is the inventor of Pokibot.
Codi (voiced by Youngwoong Jung in Korean, Mick Wingert in English) – A blue male bear who is a good chef.
Myan (voiced by Soeun Lee in Korean,Cassandra Lee Morris in English) – An orange-yellow male mouse who likes cheese.
Coco (voiced by Harim Song in Korean, Kate Higgins in English) – A hot pink female poodle who loves to write poetry. She owns a pink duckling named Quacki.
Rachel (voiced by Hyewon Jung in Korean, Tara Sands in English) – A black female sheep who likes singing and playing on her guitar.
Lila (voiced by Minjeong Yeo in Korean, Kate Higgins in English) – A light purple female pig who likes to paint pictures.
Chumli (voiced by Hyewon Jung in Korean, Lexi Fontaine in English) – A brown female squirrel who likes nuts and acorns.
Jordi (voiced by Harim Song in Korean, Kate Higgins in English) – A magenta male mouse who delivers cheese and is Myan's friend.
Billi (voiced by Chae-Ha Kim in Korean, Stephanie Sheh in English) – An indigo male cougar who is Wonderstar's rival.
Jojo (voiced by Minjeong Yeo in Korean, Cassandra Lee Morris in English) – A narcoleptic vermilion male beaver who is a woodworker.
Baker (voiced by Chea-Ha Kim in Korean, Stephanie Sheh in English) – A lavender male mole.
Barri (voiced by Changyung Hwang in Korean, Kyle McCarley in English) – A gray male bear and Jojo's best friend.
Patt (voiced by Saehae Kim in Korean, Mick Wingert in English) – A sky blue male goat who likes ducks and is Coco's neighbor.
Frido (voiced by Minjeong Yeo in Korean, Kyle McCarley in English) – A green male frog who likes to dance.
Sasha (voiced by Chea-Ha Kim in Korean, Lexi Fontaine in English) – A white female tiger who partners with Billi.
Tani (voiced by Minjeong Yeo in Korean, Larissa Gallagher in English) – A male brown bear who lives in a tent.
Turtle Finn (voiced by Chae-Ha Kim in Korean, Kyle McCarley in English) – A green male turtle who does martial arts.
Nina (voiced by Hyewon Jung) – An insensitive female purple skunk who plays piano and is Rachel’s downstairs neighbor.
.

Season 1
Welcome to Wonderville
Runaway Cheese
Poki Needs Help
Good Night Jojo
Dance Dance Frido
Bumbleberry Day
Batter Up
Puzzled Poki
Bath Time
Banana Caper
Friendship Fix-it
Writer's Block
The Mysterious Holes

Season 2
Taking Care of Quacki
Blazing Turtle Finn!
Baker Says Sorry
It's a Monster!
Finding a Best Friend
The Mystery of Flags
The Last Petal
Poki-Fong
The Missing Cake
The Most Fantastic Flute
Hogi's Big Secret
A Day in Staria
We'll Always Be Friends!

Season 1 on Hogi's Channel
A True Detective
Finding Your Finish
Run Jeni Run
Poetry in Motion
Boogie Woogie Fun
Buried Under Treasure
Melting Clock
Rachel's Song
Learning to Fly
Flocking to Friendship
Finding the Jumbo-Acorn
Codi's Cook Off
We are Wonderstar

Season 2 on Hogi's Channel
To Catch a Mango Bird
Hello, Wondercar!
Cheesy Chaos
Searching for a Snowman
A Thinking Robot
A Noisy New Neighbor
A Monster Bird Has Appeared!
How Does The Story End?
I Am A Problem Solver Too!
Whose Car Is Faster?
Tani's Song
What's That Strange Smell?
Hide-n-Seek!

Movies
Pinkfong & Baby Shark's Space Adventure
Pinkfong Sing-Along Movie 2: Wonderstar Concert

External links
Info about show on Pinkfong's Website. 
Pinkfong Wonderstar at IMDb

2010s South Korean television series
South Korean children's animated television series
Animated preschool education television series
2010s preschool education television series
2020s preschool education television series